Merlyn Edwards is an Trinidadian former cricketer who played as a wicket-keeper and left-handed batter. She appeared in four One Day Internationals for Trinidad and Tobago at the 1973 World Cup, and two Test matches and two One Day Internationals for the West Indies in 1979. She also played domestic cricket for Trinidad and Tobago.

References

External links
 
 

Possibly living people
Date of birth missing (living people)
Year of birth missing (living people)
Place of birth missing (living people)
Trinidad and Tobago women cricketers
West Indies women Test cricketers
West Indies women One Day International cricketers